Miss Universo Chile 2005, the 46th Miss Chile pageant, was held in Santiago de Chile on May 9, 2005. The pageant was broadcast live on TVO from Hacienda Santa Martina. At the conclusion of the night, outgoing titleholder Gabriela Barros crowned Renata Ruiz as the new Miss Chile.

Final Results

Delegates
14 delegates were selected this year.

Notes

 Hil Hernández, Miss Earth 2006 was selected as a delegate this year but finally she withdrew of the pageant.
 Renata Ruiz placed first runner-up in Elite Model Look International 2001. Former Miss Universe Dayana Mendoza, also participated in this competition.

References

Miss Universo Chile
2005 in Chile
2005 beauty pageants